Ostap Vital'yevich Kovalenko (born 1 March 2001) is a Russian tennis player.

Kovalenko has a career high ITF junior combined ranking of 326 achieved on 31 December 2018.

Kovalenko made his ATP main draw debut at the 2020 New York Open after receiving a wildcard for the doubles main draw.

Kovalenko plays college tennis for Hofstra University.

References

External links

Living people
2001 births
Russian male tennis players
Sportspeople from Bashkortostan
Hofstra Pride athletes
College men's tennis players in the United States
21st-century Russian people